Hill v CA Parsons & Co Ltd [1972] Ch 305 is a UK labour law case, concerning wrongful dismissal.

Facts of the case
The defendant had entered into a 'closed shop' agreement with Draughtsman and Allied Technicians Association (DATA), a trade union, which stipulated that all its technical staff should be members of DATA. The claimant, an engineer, joined a different trade union. He was given notice that he should change union affiliation in a month or be dismissed. He did not do so and the defendant dismissed him, though noted that it would not have done so if it was not for its agreement with DATA. The claimant brought proceedings to restrain the dismissal, on the basis t

Judgment
Lord Denning MR and Sachs LJ granted an injunction against his dismissal, noting that given that he still retained mutual trust and confidence with the employer the traditional objection to granting specific performance of contracts of personal service in Johnson v Shrewsbury was not applicable here. Stamp LJ dissented, arguing that if party dismisses another and opposes his reinstatement even under threat there is a break down in trust and confidence between them for employment law purposes, even if on a personal level they might 'trust' the employee. The consequences of granting an injunction for him were unknown and could create difficulties in enforcement, especially if the union were to strike on the basis of his continued employment.

See also

UK labour law

Notes

References

United Kingdom labour case law
Court of Appeal (England and Wales) cases
1972 in British law
1972 in case law